The CS 33 is a Canadian sailboat, that was designed by Raymond Wall and first built in 1979. The design is out of production.

Production
The boat was built by CS Yachts in Canada between 1979 and 1987. The company built 450 examples of the design.

Design

The CS 33 is a small recreational keelboat, built predominantly of fibreglass, with wood trim. It has a masthead sloop rig, an internally-mounted spade-type rudder and a fixed fin keel. It displaces  and carries  of ballast.

The full keel-equipped model boat has a PHRF racing average handicap of 150 with a high of 162 and low of 147.

The shoal draft keel model boat has a PHRF racing average handicap of 165 with a high of 153 and low of 204.

See also
List of sailing boat types
Similar sailboats
Abbott 33
Alajuela 33
Arco 33
C&C 3/4 Ton
C&C 33
C&C 101
C&C SR 33
Cape Dory 33
Cape Dory 330
Endeavour 33
Hans Christian 33
Hunter 33
Hunter 33-2004
Hunter 33.5
Hunter 333
Hunter 336
Hunter 340
Marlow-Hunter 33
Moorings 335
Mirage 33
Nonsuch 33
Viking 33
Watkins 33

References

External links

Keelboats
1970s sailboat type designs
Sailing yachts
Sailboat type designs by Raymond Wall
Sailboat types built by CS Yachts